Yvonne Kunze (born 5 January 1978) is a German short track speed skater. She competed at the 1998 Winter Olympics, the 2002 Winter Olympics and the 2006 Winter Olympics.

References

External links
 

1978 births
Living people
German female short track speed skaters
Olympic short track speed skaters of Germany
Short track speed skaters at the 1998 Winter Olympics
Short track speed skaters at the 2002 Winter Olympics
Short track speed skaters at the 2006 Winter Olympics
People from Radebeul
Sportspeople from Saxony
21st-century German women